Grammomys is a genus of rodent in the family Muridae endemic to Africa. 
It contains the following species:
 Arid thicket rat (Grammomys aridulus)
 Short-snouted thicket rat (Grammomys brevirostris)
 Bunting's thicket rat (Grammomys buntingi)
 Gray-headed thicket rat (Grammomys caniceps)
 Mozambique thicket rat (Grammomys cometes)
 Woodland thicket rat (Grammomys dolichurus)
 Forest thicket rat (Grammomys dryas)
 Giant thicket rat (Grammomys gigas)
 Ruwenzori thicket rat (Grammomys ibeanus)
 Eastern rainforest grammomys (Grammomys kuru)
 Macmillan's thicket rat (Grammomys macmillani)
 Ethiopian thicket rat (Grammomys minnae)
 Shining thicket rat (Grammomys poensis)
 Selous thicket rat (Grammomys selousi)
 African woodland thicket rat (Grammomys surdaster)

References
Musser, G. G. and M. D. Carleton. 2005. Superfamily Muroidea. pp. 894–1531 in Mammal Species of the World a Taxonomic and Geographic Reference. D. E. Wilson and D. M. Reeder eds. Johns Hopkins University Press, Baltimore.

 
Rodent genera
Taxa named by Oldfield Thomas
Taxonomy articles created by Polbot